Vigh is a surname. Notable people with the surname include:

Dalton Vigh (born 1964), Brazilian actor
László Vigh (born 1961), Hungarian politician
Melinda Vigh (1982–2021), Hungarian climber
Tibor Vigh (born 1941), Canadian soccer player

Hungarian-language surnames